The Causeway Classic is the annual college football game between the Sacramento State Hornets and the UC Davis Aggies in the United States. The teams exchange a Causeway Classic Trophy made from cement taken from the Yolo Causeway.

History of the game
The two teams first played each other in 1954, when the Davis Campus was still officially known as the College of Agriculture at Davis, and have played every year since, including twice in 1988 when they met in the NCAA Division II playoffs. Games hosted by UC Davis are held at Aggie Stadium. Games hosted by Sacramento State are held at Hornet Stadium.

The name "Causeway Classic" was introduced in the early 1980s and is credited to former Sacramento State sports information director Mike Duncan. It refers to the Yolo Causeway, a causeway over the Yolo Bypass on Interstate 80, which connects Davis and Sacramento, California.

Trophy
A trophy made from a concrete core sample taken from the Yolo Causeway is awarded to the winner.

For a few decades starting in 1961, the winning team received the Causeway Carriage, an authentic 19th century carriage, as the trophy. Today, the Carriage is no longer exchanged between the two teams.  The carriage was donated by Sac State alumnus Jeri Striezik in 1960 to serve as the perpetual trophy for the schools.  It was refurbished at the prison in Folsom, California.  It was transported to the winning campus at the losing school's expense.

Football
UC Davis leads the trophy series with 42 wins to Sacramento State's 19. UC Davis also leads all-time in games between the two, 46 to 23. One of Sacramento State's victories was a playoff game between the two schools in 1988.

Game results

Men's basketball
 Note: NCAA Division I play only
 Series table does not include results prior to the 1949–50 NCAA men's basketball season

Other sports
The two schools also have "Causeway Classic" competitions in baseball, volleyball, and track. There is now an all-sports trophy called "The Causeway Cup". Initiated with UCD's move to Division I, the two schools created a trophy for all sports. Each of the schools' 17 common teams compete for a pre-determined share of either five or 10 points. The school that collects the most points wins the Cup for that season. In the inaugural cup in 2004–05, UCD claimed the trophy, however, Sacramento State won it in 2005–06 with a total score of 66.25–38.75 and again in 2006–2007 with a total score of 52.66–52.34. In 2007–2008, UCD reclaimed the trophy with a total score of 67.5–37.5.

Causeway Cup results

See also 
 List of NCAA college football rivalry games

References

1954 establishments in California
Big Sky Conference rivalries
College football rivalries in the United States
Recurring sporting events established in 1954
Sacramento State Hornets football
UC Davis Aggies football
http://magazinearchive.ucdavis.edu/issues/fall13/sports.html